Die Firma is a hip hop group formed in 1996 in Cologne, Germany. The group consists of Tatwaffe (Alexander Trabhoven), Def Benski Obiwahn (Ben Hartung), and Fader Gladiator (Daniel Sluga). To date, they have released 6 albums. Their 2nd album sold over 80.000 copies in Germany, and reached number 8 on the German album charts. They are best known for their 2005 hit, “Die Eine” (“The One”), which peaked at number 2 on the German single charts. The band refers to its own style as: “Lyrics about beats which represent good and evil.”

In 2016, Tatwaffe released his 2nd solo album, "Sternenklar" ("Starlit") while Fader Gladiator worked with other artists like Lumaraa and Pillath.

Discography

Albums 
 1998: Spiel des Lebens
 1999: Das Zweite Kapitel
 2002: Das dritte Auge
 2005: Krieg und Frieden
 2007: Goldene Zeiten
 2009: Gesammelte Werke
 2010: Das Sechste Kapitel

Singles
 1996: Die Eine 96
 1999: Scheiß auf die Hookline
 1999: Kap der guten Hoffnung
 1999: Das neue Jahrtausend
 2002: Hör ma!
 2002: Strassenfest
 2003: Kein Ende in Sicht
 2005: Die Eine 2005
 2005: Spiel des Lebens
 2007: Glücksprinzip
 2007: Wunder
 2007: Wunschzettel (feat. CJ Taylor)
 2008: Scheiss auf die Hookline II

DVDs
 2002: Das dritte Auge (Limited Edition)

References

External links
 Official Website (German)
 [ Die Firma at allmusic.com]
 Die Firma at discogs.com

German hip hop groups